The Christ Church Burial Ground is a historic cemetery at 54–60 School Street in Quincy, Massachusetts.  It is the cemetery of the Anglican Christ Church congregation, the second to be established in colonial Massachusetts.  It is the site of the congregation's first church building, completed 1727, of which only a foundation element survives.  The site's oldest grave marker is dated 1737; there may be older, unmarked graves.  There are about 75 marked graves.

The cemetery was listed on the National Register of Historic Places in 1989.

See also
 National Register of Historic Places listings in Quincy, Massachusetts

References

External links
 

1737 establishments in Massachusetts
Cemeteries on the National Register of Historic Places in Massachusetts
Buildings and structures in Quincy, Massachusetts
Cemeteries in Norfolk County, Massachusetts
National Register of Historic Places in Quincy, Massachusetts
Cemeteries established in the 18th century